Gramella fulva is a Gram-negative, aerobic and motile bacterium from the genus of Gramella.

References

Flavobacteria
Bacteria described in 2020